Common Law is an American comedy-drama television series, which ran on USA Network from May 11 to August 10, 2012, and stars Michael Ealy and Warren Kole as two Los Angeles Police Department detectives who can't stand each other and are ordered to see a couples therapist to remedy the situation.

The series was created by Cormac and Marianne Wibberley and was produced by CBS Television Studios and Junction Entertainment. While originally planned to premiere on January 26, 2012, the series was pushed back until summer 2012.  The series premiered following Fairly Legal on Friday, May 11, 2012.  The show was canceled by the USA Network after one season and 12 episodes on October 31, 2012, due to low ratings.

Synopsis
The series follows two Los Angeles Police Department homicide detectives, Travis Marks and Wes Mitchell, who can't stand each other. The constant bickering between the two partners prompts their commanding officer, Captain Mike Sutton, to send them to a couples therapist, Dr. Emma Ryan, in hopes of resolving the situation.

Cast and characters

Main
 Michael Ealy as Travis Marks, a foster-raised LAPD detective assigned to the Robbery-Homicide Division. Travis is a womanizer who is known for dating women at work. Having grown up in a series of foster homes, Travis has several foster brothers and one of them calls him T-Bone.
 Warren Kole as Wesley 'Wes' Mitchell, Lawyer turned LAPD homicide detective and Travis' partner. After an incident where Wes pulled his gun on Travis on the job, the two are assigned to couple's therapy. Wes initially had a career as a lawyer before becoming a detective and is currently divorced.
 Sonya Walger as Dr. Emma Ryan, Travis Marks and Wes Mitchell's couples therapist. She is also friends with Capt. Sutton, who came to her for couple's therapy as well.
 Jack McGee as Mike Sutton, a captain with the LAPD. He is Travis and Wes' commanding officer, who tells the duo to attend therapy sessions, after an incident in which Wes pulls his gun on Travis, without any given explanation.

Recurring
 Elizabeth Chomko as Alex MacFarland Mitchell, Wes's ex-wife. She is known to have a close friendship with Travis, and has reminded Wes that the law firm he previously worked for would like to have him return.
 Alicia Coppola as Jonelle, a forensic pathologist working for the Los Angeles County Coroner's Office who formerly dated Travis.

Development and production
On June 9, 2010, USA Network placed a cast-contingent pilot order for Common Law. Cormac Wibberley and Marianne Wibberley wrote the pilot, Jon Turteltaub was attached to the project as the director, with Turteltaub, Cormac Wibberley, Marianne Wibberley, Dan Shotz and Karim Zreik serving as executive producers.

Casting announcements began in August 2010, with Michael Ealy first to be cast. Ealy portrays Travis Marks, "a maverick ladies' man who served time in juvie." Next to join the series was Warren Kole as Wes Mitchell, Travis Marks' partner, "a methodical former lawyer with a passion for cars, gardening and his ex-wife." Amy Acker was next to be cast as Dr. Elyse Ryan, the couples therapist treating Marks and Mitchell. Jack McGee, was the last actor to join the main cast, playing Captain Mike Sutton, Marks and Mitchell's commanding officer in the LAPD. Alicia Coppola was later cast in a recurring role as "a pathologist who has a history with Travis Marks."

In June 2011, it was reported that USA Network was close to picking up Common Law to series. The proposed pick up was to come with a number of creative changes to the show, which included adding more action and re-casting the role of Dr. Elyse Ryan, which had been played by Acker in the pilot; the character's name was also changed to Emma.

On July 6, 2011, USA Network green-lighted the series with an order of 11 episodes to air in the summer of 2012. Filming of the series was expected to begin in August 2011. The series is produced by CBS Television Studios and Junction Entertainment. Along with the series pickup, the network also announced that Craig Sweeny had been picked to join the series as an executive producer. By November 29, 2011, the premiere had been moved to January 26, 2012.  The series was once again pushed back to summer 2012, with the premiere date eventually settling on May 11, 2012.

On October 14, 2011, the show began filming in New Orleans, Louisiana.

Episodes

Ratings

References

External links
 
 

2010s American comedy-drama television series
2012 American television series debuts
2012 American television series endings
Fictional portrayals of the Los Angeles Police Department
Television shows set in Los Angeles
Television series by CBS Studios
USA Network original programming